It's Everything, and Then It's Gone is a 2003 PBS rock music documentary. It is a Western Reserve Public Media/PBS production, executive produced by Don Freeman and written/directed by Phil Hoffman, and was  followed by the sequel, If You're Not Dead, Play.

It's Everything, and Then It's Gone takes  viewers through the history of the first wave of mostly new wave music, post-punk, and art rock bands, all from Akron, Ohio, that arrived on the scene in the 1970s, and explains just how the Akron Sound developed. The first wave of these bands include: Devo, King Cobras (who would later reform as the Rubber City Rebels), The Bizarros, Tin Huey, Tin Huey's spin-off group The Waitresses, and The Numbers Band.

External links
 It's Everything, and Then It's Gone video on Western Reserve

Culture of Akron, Ohio
Rockumentaries